Urban sociology is the sociological study of life and human interaction in metropolitan areas. It is a normative discipline of sociology seeking to study the structures, environmental processes, changes and problems of an urban area and by doing so provide inputs for urban planning and policy making. In other words, it is the sociological study of cities and their role in the development of society.
Like most areas of sociology, urban sociologists use statistical analysis, observation, social theory, interviews, and other methods to study a range of topics, including migration and demographic trends, economics, poverty, race relations and economic trends. Urban sociology is one of the oldest sub-disciplines of sociology dating back to the mid-nineteenth century.

The philosophical foundations of modern urban sociology originate from the work of sociologists such as Karl Marx, Ferdinand Tönnies, Émile Durkheim, Max Weber and Georg Simmel who studied and theorized the economic, social and cultural processes of urbanization and its effects on social alienation, class formation, and the production or destruction of collective and individual identities.

These theoretical foundations were further expanded upon and analyzed by a group of sociologists and researchers who worked at the University of Chicago in the early twentieth century. In what became known as the Chicago School of sociology the work of Robert Park, Louis Wirth and Ernest Burgess on the inner city of Chicago revolutionized not only the purpose of urban research in sociology but also the development of human geography through its use of quantitative and ethnographic research methods. The importance of theories developed by the Chicago School within urban sociology has been critically sustained and critiqued but still, remains one of the most significant historical advancements in understanding urbanization and the city within the social sciences. The discipline may draw from several fields, including cultural sociology, economic sociology, and political sociology.

Development and rise

Urban sociology rose to prominence within North American academics through a group of sociologists and theorists at the University of Chicago from 1915 to 1940 in what became known as the Chicago School of Sociology. The Chicago School of Sociology combined sociological and anthropological theory with ethnographic fieldwork in order to understand how individuals interact within urban social systems. Unlike the primarily macro-based sociology that had marked earlier subfields, members of the Chicago School placed greater emphasis on micro-scale social interactions that sought to provide subjective meaning to how humans interact under structural, cultural and social conditions. The theory of symbolic interaction, the basis through which many methodologically groundbreaking ethnographies were framed in this period, took primitive shape alongside urban sociology and shaped its early methodological leanings. Symbolic interaction was forged out of the writings of early micro-sociologists George Mead and Max Weber, and sought to frame how individuals interpret symbols in everyday interactions. With early urban sociologists framing the city as a 'superorganism', the concept of symbolic interaction aided in parsing out how individual communities contribute to the seamless functioning of the city itself.

Scholars of the Chicago School originally sought to answer a single question: how did an increase in urbanism during the time of the Industrial Revolution contribute to the magnification of contemporary social problems? Sociologists centred on Chicago due to its tabula rasa state, having expanded from a small town of 10,000 in 1860 to an urban metropolis of over two million in the next half-century. Along with this expansion came many of the era's emerging social problems – ranging from issues with concentrated homelessness and harsh living conditions to the low wages and long hours that characterized the work of the many newly arrived European immigrants. Furthermore, unlike many other metropolitan areas, Chicago did not expand outward at the edges as predicted by early expansionist theorists, but instead 'reformatted' the space available in a concentric ring pattern. As with many modern cities the business district occupied the city centre and was surrounded by slum and blighted neighbourhoods, which were further surrounded by workingmens' homes and the early forms of the modern suburbs. Urban theorists suggested that these spatially distinct regions helped to solidify and isolate class relations within the modern city, moving the middle class away from the urban core and into the privatized environment of the outer suburbs.

Due to the high concentration of first-generation immigrant families in the inner city of Chicago during the early 20th century, many prominent early studies in urban sociology focused on the transmission of immigrants' native culture roles and norms into new and developing environments. Political participation and the rise in inter-community organizations were also frequently covered in this period, with many metropolitan areas adopting census techniques that allowed for information to be stored and easily accessed by participating institutions such as the University of Chicago. Park, Burgess and McKenzie, professors at the University of Chicago and three of the earliest proponents of urban sociology, developed the Subculture Theories, which helped to explain the often-positive role of local institutions on the formation of community acceptance and social ties. When race relations break down and expansion renders one's community members anonymous, as was proposed to be occurring in this period, the inner city becomes marked by high levels of social disorganization that prevent local ties from being established and maintained in local political arenas.

The rise of urban sociology coincided with the expansion of statistical inference in the behavioural sciences, which helped ease its transition and acceptance in educational institutions along with other burgeoning social sciences. Micro-sociology courses at the University of Chicago were among the earliest and most prominent courses on urban sociological research in the United States.

Evolution of the discipline

The evolution and transition of sociological theory from the Chicago School began to emerge in the 1970s with the publication of Claude Fischer's (1975) "Toward a Theory of Subculture Urbanism" which incorporated Bourdieu's theories on social capital and symbolic capital within the invasion and succession framework of the Chicago School in explaining how cultural groups form, expand and solidify a neighbourhood. The theme of transition by subcultures and groups within the city was further expanded by Barry Wellman's (1979) "The Community Question: The Intimate Networks of East Yorkers" which determined the function and position of the individual, institution and community in the urban landscape in relation to their community. Wellman's categorization and incorporation of community-focused theories such as "Community Lost", "Community Saved", and "Community Liberated" which centre around the structure of the urban community in shaping interactions between individuals and facilitating active participation in the local community are explained in detail below:

Community lost: The earliest of the three theories, this concept was developed in the late 19th century to account for the rapid development of industrial patterns that seemingly caused rifts between the individual and their local community. Urbanites were claimed to hold networks that were “impersonal, transitory and segmental”, maintaining ties in multiple social networks while at the same time lacking the strong ties that bound them to any specific group. This disorganization in turn caused members of urban communities to subsist almost solely on secondary affiliations with others and rarely allowed them to rely on other members of the community for assistance with their needs.

Community saved: A critical response to the community lost theory that developed during the 1960s, the community saved argument suggests that multistranded ties often emerge in sparsely-knit communities as time goes on, and that urban communities often possess these strong ties, albeit in different forms. Especially among low-income communities, individuals have a tendency to adapt to their environment and pool resources in order to protect themselves collectively against structural changes. Over time urban communities have tendencies to become “urban villages”, where individuals possess strong ties with only a few individuals that connect them to an intricate web of other urbanities within the same local environment.

Community liberated: A cross-section of the community lost and community saved arguments, the community liberated theory suggests that the separation of workplace, residence and familial kinship groups has caused urbanites to maintain weak ties in multiple community groups that are further weakened by high rates of residential mobility. However, the concentrated number of environments present in the city for interaction increases the likelihood of individuals developing secondary ties, even if they simultaneously maintain distance from tightly knit communities. Primary ties that offer the individual assistance in everyday life form out of sparsely-knit and spatially dispersed interactions, with the individual's access to resources dependent on the quality of the ties they maintain within their community.

Along with the development of these theories, urban sociologists have increasingly begun to study the differences between the urban, rural and suburban environments within the last half-century. Consistent with the community-liberated argument, researchers have in large part found that urban residents tend to maintain more spatially-dispersed networks of ties than rural or suburban residents. Among lower-income urban residents, the lack of mobility and communal space within the city often disrupts the formation of social ties and lends itself to creating an unintegrated and distant community space. While the high density of networks within the city weakens relations between individuals, it increases the likelihood that at least one individual within a network can provide the primary support found among smaller and more tightly knit networks.
Since the 1970s, research into social networks has focused primarily on the types of ties developed within residential environments. Bonding ties, common in tightly knit neighbourhoods, consist of connections that provide an individual with primary support, such as access to income or upward mobility among a neighbourhood organization. Bridging ties, in contrast, are the ties that weakly connect strong networks of individuals together. A group of communities concerned about the placement of a nearby highway may only be connected through a few individuals that represent their views at a community board meeting, for instance.

However, as the theory surrounding social networks has developed, sociologists such as Alejandro Portes and the  Wisconsin model of sociological research began placing increased leverage on the importance of these weak ties. While strong ties are necessary for providing residents with primary services and a sense of community, weak ties bring together elements of different cultural and economic landscapes in solving problems affecting a great number of individuals. As theorist Eric Oliver notes, neighbourhoods with vast social networks are also those that most commonly rely on heterogeneous support in problem-solving, and are also the most politically active.

As the suburban landscape developed during the 20th century and the outer city became a refuge for the wealthy and, later, the burgeoning middle class, sociologists and urban geographers such as Harvey Molotch, David Harvey and Neil Smith began to study the structure and revitalization of the most impoverished areas of the inner city. In their research, impoverished neighbourhoods, which often rely on tightly knit local ties for economic and social support, were found to be targeted by developers for gentrification which displaced residents living within these communities. Political experimentation in providing these residents with semi-permanent housing and structural support – ranging from Section 8 housing to Community Development Block Grant programs- has in many cases eased the transition of low-income residents into stable housing and employment. Yet research covering the social impact of forced movement among these residents has noted the difficulties individuals often have with maintaining a level of economic comfort, which is spurred by rising land values and inter-urban competition between cities as a means to attract capital investment.	 The interaction between inner-city dwellers and middle class passersby in such settings has also been a topic of study for urban sociologists.

In a September 2015 issue of "City & Community(C&C)," the article discusses future plans and discusses research needed for the coming future. The article proposes certain steps in order to react to urban trends, create a safer environment, and prepare for future urbanization. The steps include: publishing more C&C articles, more research towards segregation in metropolitan areas, focusing on trends and patterns in segregation and poverty, decreasing micro-level segregation, and research towards international urbanization changes. However, in a June 2018 issue of C&C, Mike Owen Benediktsson argues that spatial inequality, the idea of a lack of resources through a specific space, would be problematic for the future of urban sociology. Problems in neighbourhoods arise from political forms and issues. He argues that attention should be more on the relationship between spaces rather than the expansion of more urban cities.

Criticism

Many theories in urban sociology have been criticized, most prominently directed toward the ethnocentric approaches taken by many early theorists that lay the groundwork for urban studies throughout the 20th century. Early theories that sought to frame the city as an adaptable “superorganism” often disregarded the intricate roles of social ties within local communities, suggesting that the urban environment itself rather than the individuals living within it controlled the spread and shape of the city. For impoverished inner-city residents, the role of highway planning policies and other government-spurred initiatives instituted by the planner Robert Moses and others have been criticized as unsightly and unresponsive to residential needs. The slow development of empirically based urban research reflects the failure of local urban governments to adapt and ease the transition of local residents to the short-lived industrialization of the city.

Some modern social theorists have also been critical of the apparent shortsightedness that urban sociologists have shown toward the role of culture in the inner city. William Julius Wilson has criticized theory developed throughout the middle of the twentieth century as relying primarily on the structural roles of institutions, and not how culture itself affects common aspects of inner-city life such as poverty. The distance shown toward this topic, he argues, presents an incomplete picture of inner-city life. The urban sociological theory is viewed as one important aspect of sociology.

The concept of urban sociology as a whole has often been challenged and criticized by sociologists through time. Several different aspects from race, land, resources, etc. have broadened the idea. Manuel Castells questioned if urban sociology even exists and devoted 40 years' worth of research in order to redefine and reorganize the concept. With the growing population and majority of Americans living in suburbs, Castells believes that most researchers focus their work of urban sociology around cities, neglecting the other major communities of suburbs, towns, and rural areas. He also believes that urban sociologists have overcomplicated the term of urban sociology and should possibly create a more clear and organized explanation for their studies, arguing that a "Sociology of Settlements," would cover most issues around the term.

Urban sociologists focus on a range of concepts such as peri-urban settlements, human overpopulation, and field studies of urban social interaction.  Perry Burnett, who studied at the University of Southern Indiana, researched the idea of Urban sprawl and city optimization for the human population.  Some sociologists study relationships between urban patterns/policy and social issues like racial discrimination or high-income taxes.

See also

 Bibliography of sociology
 Community studies
 Ekistics
 Index of urban studies articles
 Garden city movement
 List of urban sociology topics
 Rural sociology
 Social geography
 Social theory
 Sociology of architecture
 Sociology of space
 Urban anthropology
 Urban culture
 Urban economics
 Urban history
 Urban planning
 Urban tribe
 Urban vitality

References

Further reading

 Berger, Alan S., The City: Urban Communities and Their Problems, Dubuque, Iowa : William C. Brown, 1978.
 Bourdieu, P., Distinction: A Social Critique of the Judgement of Taste, (trans) Nice, R., Cambridge, MA: Harvard University Press, 1984. 
 Durkheim, E., The Division of Labor in Society, (trans) Coser, L.A., New York: Free Press, 1997.
 Fischer, C.S., "Toward a Subculture Theory of Urbanism". American Journal of Sociology, 80, pp. 1319–1341, 1975.
 Harvey, D., "From Managerialism to Entrepreneurialism: The Transformation in Urban Governance in Late Capitalism". Geografiska Annaler: Series B, Human Geography, 71, pp. 3–17, 1989. 
 Hutchison, R., Gottdiener M., and Ryan, M.T.: The New Urban Sociology. Westview Press, Google E-Book, 2014.
 Marx, K., A Contribution to the Critique of Political Economy, (trans) Stone, N.I., Chicago: Charles H. Kerr, 1911.
 Marx, K., Capital: A Critique of Political Economy, Vol. 1, (trans) Fowkes, B., New York: Penguin, 1976.
 Molotch, H., "The City as a Growth Machine: Toward a Political Economy of Place". American Journal of Sociology, 82(2), pp. 309–332, 1976.
 Molotch, H. and Logan, J., Urban Fortunes: The Political Economy of Place, Berkeley and Los Angeles: University of California Press, 1987.
 Portes, A., and Sensenbrenner, J., "Embeddedness and immigration: notes on the social determinants of economic action", American Journal of Sociology, 98, pp. 1320–1350, 1993.
 Simmel, G., The Sociology of Georg Simmel, (trans) Wolff, K.H., Glencoe, IL: The Free Press, 1950.
 Smith, N., The New Urban Frontier: Gentrification and The Revanchist City, London: Routledge, 1996.  
 Tonnies, F., Community and Society, (trans) Loomis, C.P, East Lansing: Michigan State Press, 1957. 
 Weber, M., The City, (trans) Martindale, D., and Neuwirth, G., New York: The Free Press, 1958
 Weber, M., The Protestant Ethic and the "Spirit" of Capitalism and Other Writings, (trans) Baehr, P. and Wells, G.C., New York: Penguin, 2002. 
 Wellman, B., "The Community Question: The Intimate Networks of East Yorkers". American Journal of Sociology, 84(5), pp. 1201–31, 1979.
 Wilson, W.J., When Work Disappears: The World of the New Urban Poor, New York: Knopf, 1996.
 Wirth, L., "Urbanism as a Way of Life". American Journal of Sociology, 44(1), pp. 1–24, 1938.

 
Urban planning